The  1998 Campeonato Argentino de Rugby  was won by the selection of Unione of Buenos Aires

The 22 teams participating were divided on three levels: "Campeonato", "Ascenso", "Promocional".

Rugby Union in Argentina in 1998

National 
 The "Campeonato Argentino Menores de 21" (Under 21 championship) was won by Buenos Aires
 The "Campeonato Argentino Menores de 19" (Under 19 championship) was won by Tucumán 
 The "National Championship for clubs" was won by Jockey Club de Rosario
 The first edition of Torneo del Interior (tournament with club outside Buenos Aires) was won by Jockey Club Córdoba
 The "Torneo de la URBA" (Buenos Aires) was won by Hindú
 The "Cordoba Province Championship" was won by Tala
 The North-East Championship was won by Universitario de Tucumán

International 
 Winning the third edition of Pan American Championship, the "Pumas" conquest the qualification for 1999 Rugby World Cup
 In JuneFrance visit Argentina, and won both test with "Pumas" (35-18 and 37-12)
 In August, is Romania to visit Argentina, for a five match tour, The test is won by Pumas 68-22
 Argentina national team, in September visit Japan for a short tour (two matches). With an experimental team. lost the test match against Japan national team (29-44). In November, The Pumas visit Europe. Played six match, with three losses with Italy, France and Wales in the test match.

 In October, Argentina, won as usual the 1998 South American Rugby Championship

"Campeonato"

"Ascenso" 

Promossa: Mar del Plata
, Retrocede: Salta

Promocional

Pool A

Pool B

Final 

 Sur promoted to "Ascenso"

External links 
  Memorias de la UAR 1998
  Francesco Volpe, Paolo Pacitti (Author), Rugby 2000, GTE Gruppo Editorale (1999)

Campeonato Argentino de Rugby
Argentina